|}

The Prix de Seine-et-Oise is a Group 3 flat horse race in France open to thoroughbreds aged three years or older. It is run at Maisons-Laffitte over a distance of 1,200 metres (about 6 furlongs), and it is scheduled to take place each year in late October or early November.

History
The event is named after Seine-et-Oise, a former department of France which encompassed parts of Paris. It was established in 1906, and was originally open to horses aged two or older. It was initially run at Maisons-Laffitte over 1,400 metres.

The Prix de Seine-et-Oise was abandoned throughout World War I, with no running from 1914 to 1918. It was staged at Saint-Cloud in 1920. It began a longer period at Saint-Cloud and was cut to 1,300 metres in 1929.

The race was cancelled twice during World War II, in 1939 and 1940. It was held at Maisons-Laffitte in 1941 and Le Tremblay in 1942. It took place at Maisons-Laffitte again from 1943 to 1945, and on the second occasion its distance was 1,400 metres.

In the post-war period, from 1946 to 1951, the Prix de Seine-et-Oise was usually held at Saint-Cloud. The one exception was in 1948, when it was switched to Longchamp. It returned to Maisons-Laffitte and was shortened to 1,200 metres in 1952.

The present system of race grading was introduced in 1971, and the Prix de Seine-et-Oise was classed at Group 3 level. It was closed to two-year-olds in 1981. For a period it took place in mid-September.

The race was run at Chantilly in 1995, and again from 1997 to 2000. It was moved to late October or early November in 2002.

Records
Most successful horse (3 wins):
 Fine Art – 1942, 1944, 1945

Leading jockey (5 wins):
 Maurice Philipperon – Vertueuse (1963), King of Macedon (1978, 1979), Parioli (1985, 1986)

Leading trainer (10 wins):
 François Mathet – Menetrier (1948), Bel Amour (1951), Virgule (1954), Reinata (1955), Mystic (1957), Edellic (1959), Texanita (1964), Ancyre (1967), Zeddaan (1968), Bayraan (1974)

Leading owner (7 wins):
 François Dupré – La Melodie (1941), Menetrier (1948), Bel Amour (1951), Virgule (1954), Reinata (1955), Mystic (1957), Texanita (1964)

Winners since 1980

Earlier winners

 1906: Sourdine
 1907: Lamaneur
 1908: Negofol
 1909: Fils du Vent
 1910: Fils du Vent
 1911: Montrose
 1912: Bugler
 1913: Sardanapale
 1914–18: no race
 1919: Cri du Coeur
 1920: Samic
 1921: Hollister
 1922: São Paulo
 1923: Rosina
 1924: Niceas
 1925: Tapin
 1926: Rymenhild
 1927: Mourad
 1928: Take It Easy
 1929: Alma Savoia
 1930: Baoule
 1931: Clarawood
 1932: Assuerus
 1933: Jocrisse
 1934: Le Cyclone
 1935: Limac
 1936: May Wong
 1937: Pashavitch
 1938: Iskandar
 1939–40: no race
 1941: La Melodie
 1942: Fine Art
 1943: Dogat
 1944: Fine Art
 1945: Fine Art
 1946: Vagabond
 1947: Bir Ackeim
 1948: Menetrier
 1949:
 1950: Sarrau
 1951: Bel Amour
 1952:
 1953: Hurnli
 1954: Virgule
 1955: Reinata
 1956: Palariva
 1957: Mystic
 1958: Mon Triomphe
 1959: Edellic
 1960: Mincio
 1961: Opaline
 1962: L'Épinay
 1963: Vertueuse
 1964: Texanita
 1965: Fantastic Light
 1966: Ailes du Chant
 1967: Ancyre
 1968: Zeddaan
 1969: Democratie
 1970: Huntercombe
 1971: Fireside Chat
 1972: Calahorra
 1973: Abergwaun
 1974: Bayraan
 1975: Realty
 1976: Kala Shikari
 1977: Girl Friend
 1978: King of Macedon
 1979: King of Macedon

See also
 List of French flat horse races

References

 France Galop / Racing Post:
 france-galop.com – A Brief History: Prix de Seine-et-Oise.
 galopp-sieger.de – Prix de Seine-et-Oise.
 ifhaonline.org – International Federation of Horseracing Authorities – Prix de Seine-et-Oise (2019).
 pedigreequery.com – Prix de Seine-et-Oise – Maisons-Laffitte.

Open sprint category horse races
Maisons-Laffitte Racecourse
Horse races in France
Recurring sporting events established in 1906
1906 establishments in France